The 300 MW Streator Cayuga Ridge South Wind Farm, located near Odell, Illinois, officially started generating power in March 2010. The developer received a $170 million grant through the U.S. Department of Treasury's Section 1603 grants-in-lieu-of-tax-credits program. About 300 construction jobs were created, and for every 10 wind turbines one full-time maintenance position has been created. The county also expects to receive about $3.3 million per year in tax revenue from the wind farm.

Many of the wind farm's turbines can be easily seen from Interstate 55.

See also

List of onshore wind farms
List of wind farms in the United States

References

Energy infrastructure completed in 2010
Buildings and structures in Livingston County, Illinois
Wind farms in Illinois